Gibbon Nunatak is an isolated nunatak on the north side of the Wisconsin Range, Antarctica, standing  north of Lentz Buttress on the west side of Davisville Glacier. It was mapped by the United States Geological Survey from surveys and United States Navy air photos from 1960 to 1964, and named by the Advisory Committee on Antarctic Names for Thomas L. Gibbon, a construction driver in the Byrd Station winter party, 1959.

References

Nunataks of Marie Byrd Land